Hillsborough Avenue is a major east–west arterial road in Hillsborough County, Florida, also designated as State Road 580, U.S. Highway 41 or U.S. Highway 92 in various places.

Route description
Hillsborough Avenue runs from the Hillsborough/Pinellas county line, near Oldsmar to Interstate 4 in unincorporated Hillsborough County.  This route takes it through the city of Tampa, where it crosses the Hillsborough River. The crossings of the Hillsborough River include and eastbound vertical lift bridge, and a westbound bascule bridge.

According to the Florida Department of Transportation, Hillsborough Avenue from Nebraska Avenue to 50th Street has increased in the number of accidents reported, up from 269 in 1999 to 351 in 2005.

Landmarks
 Tampa International Airport
 Hillsborough River
 Seminole Hard Rock Hotel and Casino Tampa

References

Transportation in Tampa, Florida
U.S. Route 41
Roads in Hillsborough County, Florida
U.S. Route 92